William Beauchamp Lygon, 2nd Earl Beauchamp FRS (1783 – 12 May 1823), styled The Honourable William Lygon between 1806 and 1815 and Viscount Elmley between 1815 and 1816, was a British politician.

Early life
Lygon was the son of William Lygon, 1st Earl Beauchamp, and Catherine Denn, daughter of James Denn. He was educated at Christ Church, Oxford.

Parliament
In 1806 he was returned to parliament as one of two representatives for Worcestershire (succeeding his father), a seat he held until 1816 when he entered the House of Lords on inheriting the earldom from his father. He was elected a Fellow of the Royal Society on 6 December 1810.

Death
Lord Beauchamp died at Madresfield Court, near Malvern, Worcestershire, in May 1823. He was unmarried and was succeeded in the earldom by his younger brother, John.

References

External links

1782 births
1823 deaths
Alumni of Christ Church, Oxford
Members of the Parliament of the United Kingdom for Worcestershire
UK MPs 1806–1807
UK MPs 1807–1812
UK MPs 1812–1818
Beauchamp, E2
William 2
William
Fellows of the Royal Society